Donja Nevlja is a village in the municipality of Dimitrovgrad, Serbia and in municipality of Dragoman, Bulgaria. According to the 2002 Serbian census, the village has a population of 31 people. According to the 2014 data of the Bulgarian Citizen Registry, the village has a population of 2

References

Populated places in Pirot District
Villages in Sofia Province